Rotylenchulus is a genus of nematodes in the family Hoplolaimidae. They are mostly found in tropical and subtropical areas where they are semi-endoparasites of the roots of herbaceous and woody plants. Species are known to infest a wide range of plants including wheat, sunflowers and grapes.

Species 
Molecular characteristics provide important diagnostic tools, particularly since there is high intraspecific variability in immature females. The following species are recognised:
 Rotylenchulus anamictus
 Rotylenchulus borealis Loof & Oostenbrink, 1962
 Rotylenchulus clavicaudatus
 Rotylenchulus leptus
 Rotylenchulus macrodoratus Dasgupta et al., 1968
 Rotylenchulus macrosoma Dasgupta et al., 1968
 Rotylenchulus macrosomoides
 Rotylenchulus parvus Williams, 1960
 Rotylenchulus reniformis Linford & Oliveira, 1940
 Rotylenchulus sacchari
 Rotylenchulus variabilis

References 

Tylenchida
Plant pathogenic nematodes
Sunflower diseases
Grape pest nematodes
Secernentea genera